In crystallography, the tetragonal crystal system  is one of the 7 crystal systems. Tetragonal crystal lattices result from stretching a cubic lattice along one of its lattice vectors, so that the cube becomes a rectangular prism with a square base (a by a) and height (c, which is different from a).

Bravais lattices 

There are two tetragonal Bravais lattices: the primitive tetragonal and the body-centered tetragonal.

The base-centered tetragonal lattice is equivalent to the primitive tetragonal lattice with a smaller unit cell, while the face-centered tetragonal lattice is equivalent to the body-centered tetragonal lattice with a smaller unit cell.

Crystal classes

The point groups that fall under this crystal system are listed below, followed by their representations in international notation, Schoenflies notation, orbifold notation, Coxeter notation and mineral examples.

In two dimensions 

There is only one tetragonal Bravais lattice in two dimensions: the square lattice.

See also
Bravais lattices
Crystal system
Crystal structure
Point groups

References

External links

Crystal systems
System